Lemurchelys is an extinct genus of podocnemidid turtle, containing the single species Lemurchelys diasphax. It was described in 2011 from fossils found in the Moghara Formation of Egypt, dating to the Early Miocene.

References 

Podocnemididae
Prehistoric turtle genera